"Talking Backwards" is a song by American indie rock band Real Estate, from their third studio album, Atlas. The song was released online on January 14, 2014 along with the announcement of Atlas. The single was released as a 7" on Domino Records with "Beneath the Dunes" as its B-side on February 24, 2014.

Track listing

Reception
"Talking Backwards" received very positive reviews from contemporary music critics. The song was chosen upon release as Pitchfork Media's "Best New Track". Larry Fitzmaurice stated that, "From the chiming six-string interplay that opens the song to Martin Courtney's benevolent, honeyed vocals, all the elements are in place to cement "Talking Backwards" as another indelible Real Estate song, a testament to the band owning their lane as a truly exceptional guitar-focused group at a time when truly exceptional guitar-focused groups are in short supply." Fitzmaurice continues by saying, "The real star of "Talking Backwards", though, is the pristine production applied to the song, a dose of applied clarity that eradicates the fuzzy edges of the band's previous work for the better. Cast in this new light, Real Estate take on a radiant glow, spinning their mid-afternoon daydreams with the confidence of a good band using the tools at their disposal to become something greater."

References

External links
 

2014 singles
2014 songs
Domino Recording Company singles